Laura Dean may refer to:

 Laura Dean (choreographer), American dancer, choreographer and composer
 Laura Dean (actress), American film and television actress and voice actress
 Laura Dean, title character of Laura Dean Keeps Breaking Up with Me, American graphic novel
 Laura Dean, Marvel Comics character known as Pathway